John Gough (born 1937) is a former Gaelic football referee, who also officiated at hurling matches. He is a member of the St John's club in County Antrim.

Career
Gough took charge of the 1983 All-Ireland Senior Football Championship Final, contested by Dublin and Galway. He sent four players off.

The Irish Times reported afterwards: "The referee, John Gough, found himself in a horrid situation, and though he brought his authority to bear on some of the worst incidents of misconduct many of his decisions were mystifying and brought the ire of both sides down upon his head. Four players were sent to the line, the largest exodus in a final in recent times: three were dismissed between Galway and Kerry in 1965, two of them Kerry players". Gough talked to the media before the game and gave his opinions on the teams and this made Croke Park ask referrers not to talk anymore from 1984 championship onwards.

A St Johns man, Gough refereed the 1985 All-Ireland Under-21 Football Championship final. He refereed the final of the Ulster Senior Football Championship, the final of the National Football League final and the final of the Sigerson Cup. He was linesman for several All-Ireland finals in football and hurling.

He got the 1983 final when he was 45, gave up his whistle when he was 60 in 1997 and was national tutor and accessor of referees.

References

1937 births
Living people
All-Ireland Senior Football Championship Final referees
Gaelic football referees